Murphy Walker (born 25 October 1999) is a Scotland international rugby union player who plays for Glasgow Warriors in the United Rugby Championship. He can play both sides of the scrum, but is more usually found at tighthead.

Rugby union career

Amateur career

Walker played for Dundee HSFP.

He played for Strathallan School. With the school he was part of the team that won the Scottish Schools tournament in 2018, beating Glenalmond College in the final.

Professional career

He was made a Stage 3 player in the 2018-19 intake for the Scottish Rugby Academy, assigned to Glasgow Warriors.

He played for Stirling County in the Super 6.

He made his debut for Glasgow Warriors in the 2021-22 season, playing in the pre-season friendly against Newcastle Falcons on 3 September 2021, replacing Murray McCallum in the match on 51 minutes. He also played in the pre-season match against Worcester Warriors, on the 10 September 2021.

He made his competitive debut for the provincial side on 2 October 2021, against the South African side Sharks, again replacing McCallum at tighthead prop. Walker earned the Glasgow Warrior No. 334.

International career

He played for Scotland at U18 and u19 grades.

Walker played for the Scotland U20 side in 2018 and 2019, playing in the World U20 world championships.

He was capped by Scotland 'A' on 25 June 2022 in their match against Chile.

He was capped by Scotland against Fiji on 5 November 2022.

References

1999 births
Living people
Scottish rugby union players
People educated at Strathallan School
Glasgow Warriors players
Stirling County RFC players
Dundee HSFP players
Rugby union props
Rugby union players from Dundee
Scotland 'A' international rugby union players
Scotland international rugby union players